Serhiy Pivnenko (born 19 October 1984) is a professional Ukrainian football midfielder.

External links

Profile on FootballSquads

1984 births
Living people
Footballers from Luhansk
Ukrainian footballers
FC Shakhtar Donetsk players
FC Shakhtar-2 Donetsk players
FC Shakhtar-3 Donetsk players
FC Arsenal Kyiv players
FC Mariupol players
FC Tytan Armyansk players
Ukrainian Premier League players
Ukraine under-21 international footballers
Association football forwards